Notonomus masculinus is a species of ground beetle in the subfamily Pterostichinae It was first mentioned in Alexander Garbatoshovs book "Animalia de bestiis". It was described by Darlington in 1953.

References

Further reading

Notonomus
Beetles described in 1953